Chernivtsi Oblast Football Federation (CHOFF) is a football governing body in the region of Chernivtsi Oblast, Ukraine. It is unofficially known as the Football Federation of Bukovina. The federation is a  collective member of the Football Federation of Ukraine.

Previous Champions

1941    FC Spartak Chernivtsi
1942-44 World War II
1945    m/u 224374 Chernivtsi
1946    FC Spartak Chernivtsi (2)
1947    FC Aviagarnizon Chernivtsi
1948    FC Dynamo Chernivtsi
1949    FC Kolhospnyk Lenkivtsi
1950    FC Kolhospnyk Lenkivtsi (2)
1951    FC Dynamo Chernivtsi (2)
1952    ODO Chernivtsi
1953    FC Dynamo Chernivtsi (3)
1954    FC Dynamo Chernivtsi (4)
1955    FC Burevisnyk Chernivtsi
1956    FC Dynamo Chernivtsi (5)
1957    FC Burevisnyk Chernivtsi (2)
1958 (sp) FC Dynamo Chernivtsi (6)
1958 (fl) ODO Chernivtsi (2)
1959    FC Avanhard Chernivtsi
1960    FC Avanhard Chernivtsi (2)
1961    FC Bukovyna Chernivtsi (3)
1962    FC Kolhospnyk Kitsman
1963    ODO Chernivtsi (3)
1964    FC Kolhospnyk Kitsman (2)
1965    FC Bukovyna Chernivtsi (4)
1966    FC Bukovyna Chernivtsi (5)
1967    FC Kolhospnyk Zastavna
1968    FC Voskhod Chernivtsi
1969    FC Voskhod Chernivtsi (2)
1970    FC Lehmash Chernivtsi
1971    DOK Chernivtsi
1972    FC Kolhospnyk Kitsman
1973    FC Voskhod Chernivtsi
1974    FC Voskhod Chernivtsi (2)
1975    FC Kolos Luzhany
1976    FC Bukovyna Chernivtsi (6)
1977    FC Siret Storozhynets
1978    FC Siret Storozhynets (2)
1979    DOK Chernivtsi (2)
1980    FC Meteor Chernivtsi
1981    FC Lehmash Chernivtsi (2)
1982    FC HVZ Chernivtsi
1983    FC Karpaty Storozhynets
1984    FC Lehmash Chernivtsi (3)
1985    FC Lehmash Chernivtsi (4)
1986    FC Lehmash Chernivtsi (5)
1987    FC Emalposud Sadhora
1988    FC Emalposud Sadhora (2)
1989    FC Emalposud Sadhora (3)
1990    FC Lehmash Chernivtsi (6)
1991    FC Lada Chernivtsi
=independence of Ukraine=
1992    FC Lada Chernivtsi (2)
1992-93 FC Lada Chernivtsi (3)
1993-94 FC Lehmash Chernivtsi (7)
1994-95 FC Meblevyk-Rozvytok Chernivtsi
1995-96 FC Meblevyk Chernivtsi (2)
1996-97 FC Kolos Novoselytsia
1997-98 FC Cheremosh Vyzhnytsia
1998-99 FC Kalynivsky Rynok Sadhora
1999-00 FC Mytnyk Vadul-Siret
2000 (fl) FC Luzhany (2)
2001    FC Mytnyk Vadul-Siret (2)
2002    FC Luzhany (3)
2003    FC Mytnyk Vadul-Siret (3)
2004    FC Luzhany (4)
2005    FC Luzhany (5)
2006    FC Malyk Doroshivtsi
2007    FC Kitsman
2008    FC Luzhany (6)
2009    FC Dnister Doroshivtsi
2010    FC Banyliv
2011    FC Banyliv (2)
2012    FC Hlyboka
2013    FC Mayak Velykyi Kuchuriv
2014    FC Pidhiria Storozhynets
2015    FC Voloka
2016    FC Voloka (2)
2017    FC Universytet Chernivtsi
2018    FC Nepolokivtsi
2019    FC Voloka (3)
2020    USC Dovbush Chernivtsi

Top winners
 7 - FC Lehmash Chernivtsi
 6 - 3 clubs (Dynamo Ch., Bukovyna (Avanhard), (Kolos) Luzhany)
 5 - DOK (ODO) Chernivtsi
 4 - FC Voskhod Chernivtsi
 3 - 6 clubs (Kolhospnyk K., Emalposud, Lada, Mytnyk, Pidhiria (Siret), Voloka)
 2 - 5 clubs
 1 - 17 clubs

Cup winners

1940-41 FC Dynamo Chernivtsi
1941-44 World War II
1945    m/u 21247 Chernivtsi
1946    ODO Chernivtsi
1947    FC Aviagarnizon Chernivtsi
1948    FC Aviagarnizon Chernivtsi
1949    Franko Kolkhoz Lenkivtsi
1950    FC Dynamo Chernivtsi
1951    FC HVZ Chernivtsi
1952    ODO Chernivtsi
1953    FC Dynamo Chernivtsi
1954    FC Dynamo Chernivtsi
1955    FC Burevisnyk Chernivtsi
1956    m/u 29917 Chernivtsi
1957    FC Burevisnyk Chernivtsi
1958    FC Dynamo Chernivtsi
1959    FC Kolhospnyk Novoselytsia
1960    FC Avanhard Chernivtsi
1961    FC Voskhod Chernivtsi
1962    FC Mashynobudivnyk Chernivtsi
1963    FC Voskhod Chernivtsi
1964    FC Mashynobudivnyk Chernivtsi
1965    FC Voskhod Chernivtsi
1966    FC Mashynobudivnyk Chernivtsi
1967    FC Voskhod Chernivtsi
1968    FC Voskhod Chernivtsi
1969    FC Voskhod Chernivtsi
1970    FC Lehmash Chernivtsi
1970    DOK Chernivtsi
1971    DOK Chernivtsi
1972    FC Lehmash Chernivtsi
1973    FC Voskhod Chernivtsi
1974    FC Voskhod Chernivtsi
1975    SC Bukovyna Chernivtsi
1976    FC Siret Storozhynets
1977    FC Cheremosh Vyzhnytsia
1978    FC Siret Storozhynets
1979    FC Meteor Chernivtsi
1980    FC Lehmash Chernivtsi
1981    FC Meteor Chernivtsi
1982    SC Bukovyna Chernivtsi
1983    FC HVZ Chernivtsi
1984    FC Lehmash Chernivtsi
1984    FC Karpaty Storozhynets
1985    FC Druzhba Kyseliv
1986    FC Emalposud Sadhora
1987    FC Lehmash Chernivtsi
1988    FC Emalposud Sadhora
1989    FC Emalposud Sadhora
1990    FC Metalist Chernivtsi
1991    FC Lehmash Chernivtsi
1992    FC Lehmash Chernivtsi
1993    FC Karpaty Sadhora
1993-94 FC Karpaty Sadhora
1994-95 FC Pidhiria Storozhynets
1995-96 FC Meblevyk Chernivtsi
1995-96 FC Karpaty Sadhora
1996-97 FC Mytnyk Vadul-Siret
1997-98 FC Luzhany
1998-99 FC Universytet Chernivtsi
1999-00 FC Luzhany
2001    FC Luzhany
2002    FC Kalynivsky Rynok Sadhora
2003    FC Luzhany
2004    FC Mytnyk Vadul-Siret
2005    FC Pidhiria Storozhynets
2006    FC Mytnyk Vadul-Siret
2007    FC Luzhany
2008    FC Kitsman
2009    FC Luzhany
2010    FC Dnister Doroshivtsi
2011    FC Kolos-Maya Novoselytsia
2012    FC Banyliv
2013    FC Novoselytsia
2014    FC Pidhiria Storozhynets
2015    FC Mayak Velykyi Kuchuriv
2016    FC Voloka
2017    
2018

Professional clubs
 FC Spartak Chernivtsi, 1946
 FC Dynamo Chernivtsi, 1949
 FC Bukovyna Chernivtsi (Avangard), 1960–
 FC Lada Chernivtsi, 1994–1995 (single season)

See also
 FFU Council of Regions

References

External links
 Official website
 Muzurashu, H., Patkevych, K. Championship with Romanian roots (Першість з румунськими коріннями). Football Federation of Ukraine. 20 May 2011

Football in the regions of Ukraine
Football governing bodies in Ukraine
Sport in Chernivtsi Oblast